Wilfred John Raymond Lee (27 January 1913 – 15 October 2002) was a British film director, screenwriter, editor, and producer, who directed a number of postwar films on location in Australia for The Rank Organisation.

Biography

Early life

Lee was born in the village of Slad near Stroud, Gloucestershire, the eldest brother of Laurie Lee, author of Cider with Rosie. In childhood, the two boys were close but fell out in later life. Natural rivals, Jack gained a place at the grammar school (Marling School in Stroud), an advantage not granted to Laurie who went to Stroud Central School for Boys.

Career
He directed and co-wrote the screenplay of the pioneering motorcycle speedway film Once a Jolly Swagman (1949) which starred Dirk Bogarde.

Among Jack Lee's other films are The Wooden Horse (1950), a popular Second World War POW escape film; Turn the Key Softly (1953), a realistic drama; A Town Like Alice (1956), starring Virginia McKenna and Peter Finch, based on Nevil Shute's novel; and Robbery Under Arms (1957), a Western-style adventure set in Australia, based on the 1888 bushranger novel by "Rolf Boldrewood".

During the Australian feature film renaissance ushered in with  Picnic at Hanging Rock, he served as chairman (from 1976 to 1981) of the South Australian Film Corporation, which started the careers of Bruce Beresford and Peter Weir.

Personal life
Lee was originally engaged to be married to Hilda Lee (no relation) but the wedding was called off weeks before it was due to happen. Lee was married twice, in 1946 to the British casting director Nora Francisca Blackburne (21 April 1914 – 7 July 2009), following her divorce from Adam Alexander Dawson. They had two children before divorcing.

In 1963, he married Isabel Kidman who was an heiress to the Kidman cattle dynasty. She had two children from her previous marriage. She was not allowed to take them out of the country, so he settled in Australia, and although he returned often to Britain, he spent the rest of his life there, dying in Sydney, New South Wales, in October 2002.

References

External links

1913 births
2002 deaths
English film directors
People from Painswick
People educated at Marling School